Scopula placida is a moth of the  family Geometridae. It is found on the Solomon Islands.

References

Moths described in 1905
placida
Moths of Oceania